The 2019 Spa-Francorchamps FIA Formula 2 round was to have been a pair of motor races that were due to be held on 31 August and 1 September 2019 at the Circuit de Spa-Francorchamps in Stavelot, Belgium as part of the FIA Formula 2 Championship. It was to be the ninth round of the 2019 FIA Formula 2 Championship and run in support of the 2019 Belgian Grand Prix.

The feature race was abandoned after an accident involving Anthoine Hubert, Juan Manuel Correa and Giuliano Alesi. Hubert and Correa were taken to the circuit's medical centre where Hubert died of his injuries. Correa was stabilised and transferred to a nearby hospital. The sprint race was cancelled as a mark of respect.

Report

Championship standings before the round

ART Grand Prix driver Nyck de Vries entered the round with a thirty point lead over Nicholas Latifi in the drivers' championship. Sérgio Sette Câmara was third, a further twenty-five points behind. In the teams' championship, DAMS started the round with a sixty-five point lead over UNI-Virtuosi Racing, and ART Grand Prix a further thirty-six points behind in third.

Driver changes
Twenty drivers representing ten teams were entered into the event. Nineteen of the drivers who contested the previous round in Hungary returned for the Spa-Francorchamps round. The only exception was Campos Racing driver Arjun Maini, who left the team. Campos signed Euroformula Open championship leader Marino Sato to replace Maini prior to the round.

Qualifying
Nyck de Vries qualified on pole position, his third of the season. Sérgio Sette Câmara was second, a quarter of a second behind de Vries, but de Vries' championship rival Nicholas Latifi was only able to qualify in eleventh when a red flag interrupted his final flying lap. Latifi was later promoted to tenth on the grid by way of a three-place penalty awarded to Jordan King for ignoring yellow flags.

Feature race accident

A sequence of collisions involving multiple cars at the Raidillon corner stopped the feature race in its second lap. Trident driver Giuliano Alesi was running tenth when he spun into the barriers while going through Eau Rouge, damaging the rear of the car and bouncing back onto the circuit at the exit of the corner. Ralph Boschung, Anthoine Hubert and Jordan King had been running eleventh, twelfth and thirteenth at the time and took evasive action. Boschung cleared Alesi's Trident by taking to the tarmac run-off on the outside of the corner and King was able to slow in time to avoid contact. Hubert attempted to go to the right of Boschung, but made contact with the Trident's right-rear wheel, puncturing Boschung's tyre and causing Hubert to lose his front wing. Hubert's car continued along the run-off and crashed into a tyre barrier with the front and right side of the car. The car snapped around and was sitting at an angle that was perpendicular to the racing line, but it remained on the tarmac run-off area.

Juan Manuel Correa, who had been fourteenth at the time, was on the approach to Eau Rouge as Alesi lost control. He hit a piece of debris which lodged under a front wheel, preventing his car from steering effectively and causing it to go straight into the tarmac run-off. Correa hit Hubert at right angles, his Charouz hitting Hubert's BWT Arden in the left side of the car. The force of the collision was enough to tear Hubert's car in half, his headrest being ejected in the process. The front assembly of Correa's car broke away, exposing his feet; Correa's car also rolled over. Hubert's Arden pivoted around and hit the tyre barrier again, and came to a rest with its front wing and rear assembly up against the barriers while Correa's Charouz continued travelling several metres further along the circuit and came to rest upside-down on the grassy verge on the opposite side of the circuit. Campos driver Marino Sato braked to a complete stop to avoid cars on track, but in so doing stalled his engine and could not continue. Alesi was similarly unharmed—the accident unfolded behind him as he continued onto the Kemmel Straight—but his contact with the wall meant that his car suffered from race-ending damage and he pulled over on the approach to Les Combes. An FIA investigation into the accident found that fifteen seconds had elapsed between Alesi's initial loss of control and the cars of Hubert and Correa coming to a halt.

The seriousness of the accident and the amount of debris littered across the circuit meant that the race was immediately red-flagged. Hubert was attended to by medical staff within one minute of the accident unfolding. He and Correa were extracted from their cars and rushed to the circuit's medical centre. Hubert died of his injuries eighty-three minutes after the accident while Correa was stabilised and transferred to a hospital in Liège. He was admitted to intensive care and diagnosed with a spinal injury and fractured legs. He was reported to be conscious and lucid before undergoing surgery. His injuries ruled him out of competing for the remainder of the season. Correa was transferred to a specialist facility in the UK where he entered acute respiratory failure brought about by acute respiratory distress syndrome. His condition was downgraded to critical, but stable, but he was placed in a medically-induced coma on 7 September. Correa was brought out of the coma on 20 September, and underwent surgery to save his lower right leg. The reconstructive surgery was largely deemed a success. Correa's long-term prognosis called for up to a year of rehabilitation.

The feature race was not restarted and no result was issued, as per FIA regulations, as the leader had only completed one lap so the race was abandoned. The sprint race that had been planned for the following morning was cancelled after Hubert's death was announced. Hubert's death was the first fatality for a driver competing in the second tier of FIA-sanctioned formula racing since Henry Surtees' accident in the 2009 FIA Formula Two Championship.

Response
A manslaughter inquiry was opened by the Verviers prosecutor's office on 2 September; a number of auto racing and road safety experts have been employed as advisers. The car driven by Giuliano Alesi was impounded by the authorities as part of the investigation, forcing Trident Racing to enter a single car at the following round in Monza one week after the Spa-Francorchamps round. The Fédération Internationale de l'Automobile (FIA), the international governing body of motorsport, launched their own investigation into the accident. Hubert and Correa's cars were provided to the FIA to allow their forensic investigation to begin in earnest. The final report was published in February 2020 and concluded that there was no single contributing factor to the accident. It stated that previous contact with another car had caused Alesi to lose pressure in his rear tyre, setting off a chain reaction of events. The report also concluded that Hubert had taken every reasonable measure to avoid the initial contact and that his death was not the result of a driver error.

BWT Arden announced that they would only enter one car for Hubert's team-mate Tatiana Calderón at the Monza round. The team went on to prepare a car for Hubert, which was then left in the garage as a mark of respect. Artem Markelov was named as Hubert's replacement for the final two rounds of the championship in Sochi and Abu Dhabi. Hubert's racing number, #19, was retired and Markelov assigned #22. Matevos Isaakyan replaced the injured Correa at Charouz for the final races.

Formula 1 driver Daniel Ricciardo admitted that he had given serious thought to withdrawing from the Belgian Grand Prix that took place the next day, and offered the opinion that other drivers had also considered it. Race winner Charles Leclerc, long time friend of Hubert, dedicated the victory to him. Organisers of the Formula 2 Championship introduced an award for the best rookie driver, which was named in Hubert's honour.

The managers of the Circuit de Spa-Francorchamps announced that a planned redesign of the Raidillon run-off area that had been scheduled for 2022 would be brought forward. The redesign had been scheduled to be introduced to allow the circuit to host a round of the FIM Endurance World Championship. The proposal called for the addition of a gravel trap to make the circuit suitable for motorcycle racing events sanctioned by the Fédération Internationale de Motocyclisme (FIM), the international governing body of motorcycle racing. The managers argued that the gravel trap would benefit racing cars by arresting their speed when they left the circuit.

Classification

Qualifying

 – Jordan King and Mahaveer Raghunathan were both given a three-place grid penalty for failing to slow under yellow flags. Both drivers also had two penalty points added to their racing licences.
 – Callum Ilott failed to set a lap time, but was given permission by the stewards to start the race.

Championship standings after the round

Drivers' Championship standings

Teams' Championship standings

References

External links 
 

Spa-Francorchamps
Formula 2
Formula 2
Formula 2
Auto racing controversies
Formula 2